David Moran (29 June 1988) is an Irish Gaelic footballer who plays for the Kerins O'Rahilly's club and at senior level for the Kerry county team.

He is the son of the former Kerry player and manager Denis "Ogie" Moran.

Career
Moran played for Kerry in the 2006 All-Ireland Minor Football Championship. He won a Munster Minor Football Championship after overcoming Tipperary Morans side later made it to the All-Ireland where they faced Roscommon, despite being tipped to win Kerry lost out after a re-play.

He joined the county's under-21 team in 2007 but had a surprise loss to Clare

He was again part of the side in 2008. Wins over Limerick, Cork and Tipperary meant Moran won a Munster Under-21 Football Championship. Kerry later qualified for the All-Ireland final where they faced Kildare. Moran scored two points as Kerry won a first All-Ireland Under 21 Football Championship since 1998.

His last year at under-21 level was in 2009, when Kerry lost to Cork.

and played with the county in the All-Ireland Under-21 Football Championship. He was added to the Kerry senior squad for the 2008 National Football League and appeared in the first three games against Donegal, Tyrone and Derry. He won the 2008 All-Ireland Under-21 Football Championship with Kerry.

Moran has won three All Ireland Senior Football Championships with Kerry, notably across three different decades.

Career Statistics 

 As of match played 24 July 2022.

Honours
Kerry
 All-Ireland Senior Football Championship (3): 2009, 2014, 2022
 Munster Senior Football Championship (10): 2010, 2013, 2014, 2015, 2016, 2017, 2018, 2019, 2021, 2022
 National Football League (5): 2009, 2017, 2020, 2021, 2022
 All-Ireland Under 21 Football Championship (1): 2008
 Munster Under-21 Football Championship (1): 2008
 Munster Minor Football Championship (1): 2006

Other
All-Ireland Inter-Firm Senior Football Championship (1) 2007
Munster Inter-Firm Senior Football Championship (1) 2007
Kerry Inter-Firm Senior Football Championship (1) 2007

Individual

 GAA-GPA All Stars Awards (2): 2014, 2019

References

1988 births
Living people
All Stars Awards winners (football)
Kerins O'Rahilly's Gaelic footballers
Kerry inter-county Gaelic footballers
People from Tralee
Winners of one All-Ireland medal (Gaelic football)